Jeffrey Perry may refer to:

 Jeff Perry (American actor) (born 1955), American actor of stage, television and film
 Jeffrey Perry (British actor) (1948–2012), British stage and screen actor
 Jeff Perry (politician) (born 1964), former member of the Massachusetts House of Representatives

See also
 Geoffrey Perry (1927–2000), physicist